Forano is a  (municipality) in the Province of Rieti in the Italian region of Latium, located about  north of Rome and about  southwest of Rieti.

Forano borders the following municipalities: Cantalupo in Sabina, Filacciano, Poggio Catino, Poggio Mirteto, Ponzano Romano, Selci, Stimigliano, Tarano.

The Roman Catholic parish church is Santissima Trinità.

Demographic evolution

References

External links
 www.galsabina.com/forano/

Cities and towns in Lazio